Happy Gilmore is a 1996 American sports comedy film directed by Dennis Dugan and produced by Robert Simonds. It stars Adam Sandler as the title character, an unsuccessful ice hockey player who discovers a newfound talent for golf. The screenplay was written by Sandler and his writing partner Tim Herlihy, in their second feature collaboration after the previous year's Billy Madison; the film also marks the first of multiple collaborations between Sandler and Dugan. The film was released in theaters on February 16, 1996, by Universal Pictures. Despite receiving mixed-to-negative reviews from critics, Happy Gilmore was a commercial success, earning $39 million on a $12 million budget. The film won an MTV Movie Award for "Best Fight" for Adam Sandler versus Bob Barker.

Plot

Happy Gilmore is a short-tempered, unsuccessful ice hockey player whose only skills are fighting and a powerful slapshot he learned from his late father. After yet another failed tryout, Happy learns that his grandmother owes the IRS $270,000 in back taxes; she has 90 days to pay off the debt or face foreclosure on her house. Happy sends his grandmother to a retirement home, where residents are secretly mistreated until he can pay the debt.

Two movers repossessing Happy's grandmother's furniture challenge him to a long-drive contest using his grandfather's old golf clubs. With an unorthodox, slapshot-style swing, Happy hits a ball some 400 yards, winning $20 from the movers. He starts hustling golfers at a driving range and meets Derick "Chubbs" Peterson, a former professional golf tour star who lost a hand in an alligator attack. Chubbs urges Happy to enter a local tournament where the winner will earn an automatic spot on the tour; Happy, desperate to get back his grandmother's house, agrees when Chubbs informs him of the significant prize money involved.

Happy wins the local tournament and quickly becomes a fan favorite on the tour thanks to his extraordinarily long drives and unorthodox antics, such as asking the crowd to cheer during his swing instead of staying quiet. He also meets arrogant pro Shooter McGavin, who disapproves of his lack of golf etiquette. Though his driving is incredible, Happy's putting is terrible, and his profane on-course tantrums soon draw the ire of tour Commissioner Doug Thompson. Tour public relations head Virginia Venit convinces Thompson not to expel Happy from the tour, citing improved TV ratings, higher attendance, and new sponsorship offers; she promises to help Happy with his anger. Happy improves his performance and behavior with Virginia's support, and the two form a romantic connection.

Shooter hires a heckler named Donald to mock Happy at a pro-am event; Happy plays poorly and gets into a fistfight with his celebrity partner, Bob Barker. Thompson fines Happy $25,000 and suspends him for a month, seemingly ending his hopes of saving his grandmother's house. Virginia secures Happy a lucrative endorsement deal with Subway to make up the difference, but the house is put up for auction, and Shooter spitefully outbids Happy. Happy strikes a deal with Shooter for the upcoming Tour Championship: If Happy wins, Shooter will return the house to Happy's grandmother, but if Shooter wins, Happy will quit the tour. Knowing he must improve his short game to win, Happy seeks out Chubbs, who helps Happy improve his putting by practicing at a miniature golf course. As thanks, Happy presents Chubbs with the head of the alligator that bit off his hand, but a startled Chubbs falls out a window to his death.

Now determined to win the Tour Championship for Chubbs and his grandmother, Happy plays well and leads at the end of the third round. Shooter, desperate to finally win a Tour Championship and get rid of Happy, again hires Donald, who drives a car onto the course and runs over Happy, impairing his long-drive ability and focus. Shooter takes the lead, but Happy, encouraged by his grandmother, rallies to tie him. On the 18th hole, a TV tower damaged by Donald's car falls onto the green and blocks Happy's line to the hole, but Happy miraculously uses it as a Rube Goldberg machine to sink his putt for the win. Enraged, Shooter tries to steal one of Happy's gold jackets but is beaten by a mob of fans led by Happy's imposing ex-boss, Mr. Larson. Happy, his grandmother, his caddy, and Virginia celebrate at his grandmother's house, where Happy sees a vision of a two-handed Chubbs with Abraham Lincoln and the alligator.

Cast

Production

Development
Happy Gilmore was directed by Dennis Dugan, and written by Saturday Night Live (SNL) alumni Tim Herlihy and Adam Sandler. Herlihy and Sandler were roommates in college and wrote stand-up comedy together, before moving on to screenplays. After Sandler was fired from SNL in 1995, he moved on to films. He and Herlihy wrote Billy Madison (1995), which proved successful for distributor Universal Pictures. As such, Herlihy and Sandler began a new project. In an office during a brainstorming session, they came up with a high-concept premise for a film about a "hockey player who smacks a 400 yard drive". Judd Apatow performed a script rewrite, although he went uncredited.

The Happy Gilmore character is loosely based on Sandler's childhood friend Kyle McDonough, who played ice hockey and would golf with Sandler as they grew up. Sandler could never hit the ball as far as McDonough, and figured that McDonough's hockey skills gave him an edge. Meanwhile, Chubbs Peterson's missing hand is an in-joke referencing actor Carl Weathers' film Predator (1987), which depicts his character losing his arm. Herlihy and Sandler included any joke that made them laugh and do not remember who came up with which, although Herlihy takes credit for Shooter McGavin's "I eat pieces of shit like you for breakfast" line. In a 1994 interview, Sandler cited the golf comedy Caddyshack (1980), a film he and Herlihy bonded over in college, as inspiration.

Former pro golfer Mark Lye served as a consultant on the script, and told Herlihy and Sandler after seeing their initial ideas, "You gotta be crazy. You cannot do a movie like that." According to Lye, the initial drafts featured Happy winning the Masters Tournament: "They had the green jacket. They were desecrating the USGA. Making fun of Augusta National." He suggested that Happy win a fictional tournament, and Herlihy and Sandler changed the jacket's color from green to gold. Lye also disliked the unrealistic nature of early drafts, which depicted Happy repeatedly making 400-yard drives, so he took the crew to a PGA Tour event so they could understand the atmosphere of golf. The final script, the one Lye gave approval, was Herlihy and Sandler's fifth draft.

Dugan became attached to direct through Sandler. Years earlier, Dugan had attempted to cast Sandler in one of his films, but the producers did not let him because Sandler was not well-known. "A couple of years later, [Sandler] is big", Dugan said. "I wanted to be hired to direct Happy Gilmore with him. I walk in the room, and he says: 'You're the guy who wanted to give me that part. I don't need to know anything else, I want to work with you.'" Happy Gilmore was produced on a budget of $12 million and filmed entirely at locations in British Columbia. Most scenes taking place at golf courses were filmed at Pitt Meadows at the Swan-e-set Bay Resort & Country Club, while interior shots, such as those in the broadcast booth, took place in an abandoned Vancouver hospital. Arthur Albert served as cinematographer, while Mark Lane was the set decorator. Devo frontman Mark Mothersbaugh composed the film's soundtrack.

Casting
Christopher McDonald declined the role of Shooter McGavin twice because he was tired of playing villains and wanted to spend more time with his family. Kevin Costner was approached but turned it down in favor of another 1996 golf-themed comedy, Tin Cup, while Bruce Campbell lobbied hard for the part. McDonald became interested in the role after winning a round of golf, and decided to take it after he met with Sandler. According to McDonald, Dugan "didn't want to see the Bad Guy 101 again" and gave McDonald the freedom to improvise on set.

Happy Gilmore features appearances from Richard Kiel, known for playing Jaws in the James Bond film series; Bob Barker, the host of The Price Is Right; and Verne Lundquist, a football sportscaster.

According to Lundquist, he filmed his scenes in the abandoned hospital as production wrapped. Sandler's New York University roommate Jack Giarraputo sat next to Lundquist in every shot, as Sandler wanted him to appear in the film. In 2016, Lundquist stated he still gets a monthly $34 check from the Screen Actors Guild for his appearance in the film.

Filming
Filming took place from July 6 to September 1, 1995, in Vancouver, British Columbia, Canada.

Reception

Box office
Happy Gilmore was a commercial success, ranking number two at the U.S. box office on its debut weekend with $8.5 million in revenue, behind Broken Arrow. The film was made for $12 million and grossed a total of $41.2 million worldwide, with $38.8 million of that at the North American domestic box office.

Critical response 

On Rotten Tomatoes, Happy Gilmore has an approval rating of 61% based on 54 reviews, with an average rating of 5.8/10. The website's critics consensus reads: "Those who enjoy Adam Sandler’s schtick will find plenty to love in this gleefully juvenile take on professional golf; those who don’t, however, will find it unfunny and forgettable." On Metacritic, the film has a weighted average score of 31 out of 100 based on 14 critics, indicating "generally unfavorable reviews." Audiences surveyed by CinemaScore gave the film an average grade "B+" on an A+ to F scale.

Brian Lowry of Variety stated that "The general tone nevertheless makes it difficult to elevate the gags beyond an occasional chuckle". Lowry only noted a few scenes he found inspired, including the fight scene with Bob Barker and when Happy attempts to find his "Happy Place" which was described as "Felliniesque". Roger Ebert gave the film one and a half stars out of four, stating that Adam Sandler's character "doesn't have a pleasing personality: He seems angry even when he’s not supposed to be, and his habit of pounding everyone he dislikes is tiring in a PG-13 movie". Ebert also noted the film's product placement stating that he "probably missed a few, but I counted Diet Pepsi, Pepsi, Pepsi Max, Subway, Budweiser (in bottles, cans, and Bud-dispensing helmets), Michelob, Visa cards, Bell Atlantic, AT&T, Sizzler, Red Lobster, Wilson, Golf Digest, the ESPN sports network, and Top-Flite golf balls". Owen Gleiberman of Entertainment Weekly gave the film a grade "D+" calling it "A one-joke Caddyshack for the blitzed and jaded," although he did praise Sandler's confident performance.

Darren Bignell of Empire wrote: "The real surprise is that it's a lot of fun, with Sandler becoming more personable as the film progresses, and a couple of truly side-splitting scenes."

Ratings effect
The scene with Barker beating up Gilmore increased ratings for The Price Is Right among younger demographics. Barker claimed that someone in the audience asked him about Happy Gilmore almost every day. The show's producers had previously tried, but failed, to appeal to a younger demographic with a syndicated variation of the game hosted by Doug Davidson.

Accolades

In popular culture
The film has developed a cult following in the golf community, with Golf.com, Consequence of Sound, and Golf Digest praising the film, predominantly praising the villain Shooter McGavin.

Actor Viggo Mortensen is reportedly a huge fan of the film.

The "Happy Gilmore swing," featuring a walking or running approach, is often imitated or attempted for fun, including by touring golf professionals. Three-time major champion Pádraig Harrington is particularly well known for his impression and even uses the technique in training. The TV series Sport Science has featured Harrington's "Happy Gilmore swing," demonstrating how it can indeed generate additional distance, though at the cost of accuracy.

Long drive champion and professional golfer Jamie Sadlowski, also a former hockey player who can hit golf balls over 400 yards, has been called "the real-life version of Happy Gilmore."

Lee Trevino regretted his appearance in the film and said he would not have done it if he had known how much swearing there would be in the movie.

In 2015, Sandler and Barker reenacted their fight for the Comedy Central Night of Too Many Stars fundraiser in aid of autism charities.

In 2020, McDonald reprised his role as Shooter in the trailer for the video game PGA Tour 2K21.

Future
In September 2022, Sandler stated that he hopes to eventually make a sequel. The actor explained that he has been creating ideas for what a follow-up movie would be, while stating the character would be involved in a senior golf tour.

References

External links

 
 
 
 
 

1996 films
1990s sports comedy films
American sports comedy films
Boston Bruins
Films directed by Dennis Dugan
Films produced by Robert Simonds
Films shot in Vancouver
Golf films
Universal Pictures films
Films with screenplays by Adam Sandler
Films with screenplays by Tim Herlihy
Films scored by Mark Mothersbaugh
1996 comedy films
1990s English-language films
Films set in Connecticut
1990s American films